The Philippine Amateur Baseball Association (PABA) is the national governing body for amateur baseball in the Philippines.

Presidents
Dominador Pangilinan (?–1986)
Hector Navasero (1986–2013)
Ely Baradas (2013; acting)
Marty Eizmendi (2013–2018)
Chito Loyzaga (2018–)

References

External links
Philippine Amateur Baseball Association profile at the Philippine Olympic Committee website (Archived)
Philippine Amateur Baseball Association profile at the Baseball Federation of Asia website

Baseball in the Philippines
Baseball governing bodies in Asia
Baseball